Alexander Johnson (5 December 1917 – 31 July 1944) was an English professional footballer who played as a full back in the Football League for Norwich City.

Personal life
Johnson was married. He served as a corporal in the Royal Air Force Volunteer Reserve during the Second World War. His body was never recovered, and he is commemorated at the Alamein Memorial.

Career statistics

References

1917 births
1944 deaths
Military personnel from County Durham
Footballers from Gateshead
Association football fullbacks
English footballers
English Football League players
Birtley F.C. players
Norwich City F.C. players
Royal Air Force Volunteer Reserve personnel of World War II
Royal Air Force airmen
Royal Air Force personnel killed in World War II
Victims of aviation accidents or incidents in 1944
Accidental deaths in Oman